Tedania elegans is a species of sea sponge in the family Tedaniidae found in Australia.

References

External links 
 Tedania elegans at the World Register of Marine Species (WoRMS)

Poecilosclerida
Sponges described in 1888
Sponges of Australia